Slovak recording artist Marika Gombitová entered the music industry in 1975 by recording promotional compositions entitled "Karta" and "Nájdem hviezdu" for SRo Košice. Prior to that, she performed with local bands such as Profily (1971–73) and the orchestras of Juraj Szabadoš, respectively of Július Olajoš (1974–75). Following an offer to become a member of Ján Lehotský's ensemble, she joined Modus in 1976 as their only female vocalist. Simultaneously with staging for the group, Gombitová recorded a number of tracks as soloist; among others also "Čo má rieka" and "Deň ako z pohľadnice". Eventually, "Boľavé námestie" was released as her own debut single issued on OPUS Records in 1977.

Her solo breakthrough came along with the second single release "Študentská láska." The song won two awards at the Bratislavská lýra, being classified as the most selling SP in Slovakia in July 1978. By the end of next year, Gombitová issued a debut album called Dievča do dažďa (1979), of which total sale surpassed 200,000 copies. In addition, the set would be ranked in a critics' survey published by Nový čas as the 20th Best Slovak Album of All Time. Furthermore, the album's lead single "Vyznanie," received several music awards, including a prize at the 4th Intervision Song Festival in Sopot, Poland in 1980. Regrettably on December 1, 1980, shortly before launching her second set Môj malý príbeh, singer sustained serious injuries upon her return from a concert. After her partial recovery, she successfully returned to the studios and continued in publishing a new material; though, as a physically disabled artist since 1981.

Until now, Gombitová released ten studio albums, including one double set — Dievča do dažďa (1979), Môj malý príbeh (1981), Slnečný kalendár (1982), Mince na dne fontán (1983), №5 (1984), Voľné miesto v srdci (1986), Ateliér duše (1987), Kam idú ľudia? (1990) and Zostaň (1994). Each of them on OPUS, with exception of her final record issued by H&V Jumbo Records. Along with Modus, Gombitová recorded four album releases — Modus (1979), Balíček snov (1980), 99 zápaliek (1981) and Záhradná kaviareň (1983). She also participated on the Collegium Musicum's art rock project On a Ona (1979), as well as contributed to three original soundtracks — Smoliari (1979), Neberte nám princeznú (1980) and Tisícročná včela (1983). Her retrospective compilations consist of ten collections, two of which are double sets — Moje najmilšie (1985), Polnočné otázky: 16 Naj 1984–1993 (1993), The Best of the Best (1998), Gold (2005), Vyznanie (2007), Na Bratislavskej Lýre (2008), Duetá (2010) and Single (2016). Apart from four export releases, her discography also features EP Slávnosť úprimných slov (1987), video album Ateliér duše (1987), and twenty-six singles in total.

According to ČNS IFPI, the International Federation of the Phonographic Industry for the Czech Republic and Slovakia, Marika Gombitová demonstrably sold at least one million vinyl albums.

Albums

Studio albums

Compilation albums

Soundtrack albums

Limited editions

Export albums 

Notes
 A  All tracks released on Modus studio albums were later issued on a bonus CD of her own double set Slnečný kalendár: 2CD Collectors Edition (#91 2793) in 2008, including English versions of the Modus export release.
 B  Gombitová's contributions to soundtracks Smoliari and Neberte nám princeznú were also released altogether on a bonus disc of her double set Môj malý príbeh: 2CD Collectors Edition (#91 2792) in 2007.

Extended plays 

Notes
 C  Tracks performed by Gombitová were in addition available also on CD as bonus tracks of Ateliér duše 2004 re-release (#91 2561).

Singles

As lead artist

As featured artist

Other charted songs 

Notes
 D  Initially, the work was credited to Gombitová herself on the VA compilation OPUS '79 (#9113 0816).
 E  "Nenápadná" was classified as the fourth most selling SP on Top 5 of the Slovak Year End Chart in 1987.
 F  Denotes a single with featuring only her background vocals.
 G  Žbirka's album Dúhy charted in 2005 at #12 on the Czech Albums chart.
 H  "Tak som chcela všetkých milovať" was issued only as a promotional single. In 2008, the composition was in addition remixed by Jarek Šimek.

Other appearances 

Notes
 H  Modrý album by Žbirka peaked at number #11 on the Czech Albums Chart.

Unreleased songs 

Notes
 I  While authors of her Czech biography from 2008 credited "Náhodou" to be written by Ivan Horváth and Alojz Čobej, according to the Oskar Lehotský study the song was composed by his namesake Ján Lehotský.

Videos

Video albums

Music videos 

Notes
J  Denotes a music video with featuring only her background vocals.

See also 
 Slovak popular music
 The 100 Greatest Slovak Albums of All Time
 List of awards and nominations received by Marika Gombitová

References 
General
 
 
 
Specific

Bibliography

Further reading

External links 
  at Official website
 Marika Gombitová discography at marikagombitova.sk
 
 Marika Gombitová discography on Discogs
 

Discography
Pop music discographies
Discographies of Slovak artists